Sean Friar (born 1985 in Los Angeles, California) is an American composer and pianist. He currently lives in Denver, Colorado.

Biography
Sean Friar was born and raised in Los Angeles. He studied Music Composition and Psychology at UCLA where he graduated in 2007. He continued his studies at Princeton University, where he received an M.F.A. and Ph.D. in Composition. His primary teachers were Paul Chihara, Paul Lansky, Steven Mackey, and Dmitri Tymoczko.

Friar has been commissioned by the Los Angeles Philharmonic, Ensemble Modern, New World Symphony, Alarm Will Sound, American Composers Orchestra, NOW Ensemble, the Cabrillo Festival of Contemporary Music, Present Music, and the Scharoun Ensemble of the Berlin Philharmonic. Other performers of his music include So Percussion, Ensemble Klang, Crash Ensemble, Psappha New Music Ensemble, Alter Ego (Musikensemble), Ensemble Argento, and many others.

Friar is the recipient of the 2011 Rome Prize in Music Composition. He serves as the chair of the composition department at the Lamont School of Music at the University of Denver and was previously on the Music Composition faculty at the USC Thornton School of Music.

Concert Works

Friar's music is known for its propulsive energy, adventurous orchestration, and sense of humor.

Large Ensemble
2009 "Out of Line" for chamber orchestra
2011 "Clunker Concerto" for percussion quartet on junk car parts and chamber orchestra
2013 "Noise Gate" for orchestra
2013 "In the Blue" for sinfonietta
2015 "Finding Time" for sinfonietta
2017 "Dynamics"/"Concerto for Cello and Wind Ensemble" for solo cello and chamber winds.
2019 "Emerald Oasis" for orchestra

Solo Music
2010 Teaser for solo cello
2010 Oboemobo for solo oboe and effects pedals
2012 Wind-up Etude for solo piano
2016 Chrysalis for soloist on piano and percussion
2018 Elastic Loops for solo piano (composed 2007, revised 2018)

Chamber Music
2006 "Hell-Bent" for violin, cello, and piano
2008 "Little Green Pop" for two saxophones, trombone, electric guitar, piano, percussion, and sound engineer
2008 "String Quartet"
2009 "Velvet Hammer" for flute, clarinet, electric guitar, piano, and bass
2009 "Scale 9" for clarinet, violin, cello, piano, and percussion (also versions with flute and viola)
2010 "Fighting Words" for soprano, clarinet, electric guitar, violin, cello, percussion, drum kit, and piano
2010 "Short Winds" for woodwind quintet (alternate version for saxophone quartet)
2012 "One-Way Trip" for clarinet, horn, two violins, viola, cello, bass, and piano
2012 "Etude for English Horn and Prepared Piano" for English horn and prepared piano
2013 "Breaking Point" for clarinet, trumpet, electric guitar, two violins, viola, cello, bass, percussion, and piano
2014 "Two Solitudes" for flute, viola, and harp
2014 "Four Streets" for percussion quartet
2015 "Shades" for alto sax and piano
2016 "Kindly Reply" for brass quintet
2016 "Come Again" for two pianos
2019 "Before and After" for flute, clarinet, electric guitar, piano, and bass
2020 "Fit" for two digital pianos with dynamic microtonal pitch-mapping (using Pianoteq software)

Electronic
2008 Boomdinger for percussion quartet and laptop orchestra. (Collaboration with composer, Cameron Britt.)

Awards
2007, 2008, 2009, 2011 Morton Gould Young Composer Award
2008 Lee Ettelson Award
2009 Aaron Copland House Residency 
2011 Rome Prize
2011 Finalist for Gaudeamus Prize
2012 Charles Ives Prize
2012 Chamber Music America Classical Commissioning Grant
2013 Fromm Foundation Commission

Recordings
2011 – "Velvet Hammer" with NOW Ensemble on "Awake" (New Amsterdam Records)
2012 – "Short Winds" with Madera Quintet on "Five at Play" (Crescent Phase Recordings)
2012 – "Teaser" with Mariel Roberts on "nonextraneous sounds" (Innova Recordings)
2018 – "Kindly Reply" with the Brass Project on "Cityscaping"
2021 – "Elastic Loops" with Matthew McCright on "Endurance" (Vox Novus)
2021 –  "Before and After" with NOW Ensemble on "Before and After" (New Amsterdam Records)

References

External links

 

1985 births
Living people
American male composers
21st-century American composers
Princeton University alumni
21st-century American male musicians